The Execution is a 2021 Russian mystery thriller film directed by Lado Kvataniya. It premiered at the 2021 Fantastic Fest and theatrically released in Russia on April 21, 2022.

Plot 
The film tells about an investigator named Issa Davydov, who, 10 years after investigating a series of brutal murders, finds out that innocent people were punished.

Cast

References

External links 
 

2021 films
2020s Russian-language films
2021 crime thriller films
2020s mystery thriller films
Russian detective films
Russian crime thriller films
Russian mystery thriller films